Townsend's pocket gopher (Thomomys townsendii) is a species of pocket gopher endemic to the northwestern United States.

Description
Like other pocket gophers, they have a large head, a short, muscular neck, small eyes and ears, and short legs. The forefeet are large with powerful digging claws, while the hindfeet are stout, with flat soles. There is a fur-lined cheek pouch on either side of the mouth, from which the name "pocket gopher" derives. Females have eight teats.

The fur is greyish in color over most of the body, but a richer tan on the underparts. There is a patch of white fur on the chin, and some individuals also have white markings on the head. The tail is almost entirely hairless. Melanistic individuals have also been reported, being almost entirely black in color, apart from white spots on the chin or feet.

Distribution and habitat
Townsend's pocket gopher is found in disjunct populations across southern Idaho, northern Nevada, southeastern Oregon, and northeastern California. They may also be found in high numbers in artificially irrigated cropland. Their expansion into neighboring areas may be limited by absence of saltgrass, or by competition with Botta's pocket gopher.

Two subspecies are currently recognised:

 T. t. townsendii - Idaho, Malheur River and tributaries in Oregon
 T. t. nevadensis - throughout the remainder of the range

Biology and behavior
Townsend's pocket gopher feeds largely on the root-stalks of saltgrass, but also eats other grasses, alfalfa, and other large rooted plants, including agricultural crops such as potatoes. Common predators include barn owls, and the gopher is also considered to be the primary host of the chewing louse Geomydoecus idahoensis. Breeding probably occurs around January or February, and litters average seven young. Mating is promiscuous, and based on female choice. Hybrids between Townsend's and Botta's pocket gophers have been reported.

Like other pocket gophers, Townsend's species spends most of its adult life underground. The entrances to the tunnels are normally kept blocked with soil to prevent access by predators. Individuals are solitary outside of the breeding season.

References

Townsend's Pocket Gopher
Endemic fauna of the United States
Mammals of the United States
Rodents of North America
Townsend's pocket gophe
Fauna of the Western United States
Townsend's pocket gopher
Mammals described in 1839
Least concern biota of the United States
Taxonomy articles created by Polbot
Townsend's pocket gopher